The Regression Theorem, first proposed by Ludwig von Mises in his 1912 book The Theory of Money and Credit, states that the value of money can be traced back ("regressed") to its value as a commodity. The theorem claims that at a point in time there was a good with intersubjective exchange value based on the value of it as a commodity (i.e. silver, gold, etc.), which lead to the good's capacity in given circumstances to procure a specific quantity of other goods as an equivalent in exchange and is derived from the human process of valuing individual goods not granted from nature, based on emotion which was then gradually adopted as money.

Recently, there has been a debate about applying Regression Theorem to Cryptocurrency such as Bitcoin. Since Bitcoin (for instance) is not backed by any commodity, it appears to fail the definition of a currency according to the Regression Theorem. Others hold the view that Bitcoin does fit the definition as it is at once a payment system and money, with the source of value being the payment system.

References

Money